eFootball is an association football simulation video game developed and published by Konami. It is a free-to-play game after being completely rebranded from the original Pro Evolution Soccer (known as Winning Eleven in Japan) series to the eFootball series. The game's first year, entitled eFootball 2022, was released on 30 September 2021. It was later changed to the game's second year, eFootball 2023, on August 25, 2022. This game is part of the International Esports Federation's World Championship and North and Eastern Europa League (NEEC).

Development 
On 21 July 2021, Konami released a six-minute video revealing the new game. The announcement revealed that the Pro Evolution Soccer brand had been dropped.

The game was released on PlayStation 4, PlayStation 5, Microsoft Windows, Xbox One, and Xbox Series on 30 September 2021. It was built using Unreal Engine 4 for the first time in the franchise.

On 8 October 2021, Konami announced that it would release a new update with fixes for the game's issues on 28 October 2021. The update was delayed and the release postponed to November 2021. Konami then launched the update 0.9.1 on 5 November, and announced that the 1.0 update release was delayed until Spring 2022. Version 1.0.0 of eFootball 2022 was finally announced on 6 April 2022, with release date on 14 April 2022.

On 31 May 2022, Konami announced their roadmap for the rest of 2022 up until 2023 for features such as Master League and the number of teams that can be used in offline mode which will all be released as paid content.

eFootball 2023 update 
Later on 25 August 2022, eFootball now has been updated to eFootball 2023, with new club and league licences and other improvements. New club licences, Club America, Chivas de Guadalajara, AC Milan and Inter now will be featured again in eFootball; however, Juventus will be not featured again in eFootball, after they had an agreement to be featured in FIFA 23. Liga MX and the rest of clubs, now has been featured as a league in eFootball. On 3 October 2022, eFootball updated with the new features, adding with some new club licences, updated players, updated faces, etc. However, 25 full leagues' worth of club teams and all national teams were still unable to be played with in all modes except training mode.

Reception 

At launch, eFootball 2022 was panned by critics and players, who criticized the "atrocious" graphics, lack of content, laggy engine and finicky controls. With 92% negative reviews, it became the worst-rated game on Steam a day after launch, and the lowest-rated game of 2021 on the review aggregator Metacritic. Konami later apologised for the game's many issues and said they would work on improving it. A major "1.0" update, that aimed to address many of these issues, was released 14 April 2022 on PC and consoles.

References

External links

 
 
 
 
  
 
 

Association football video games
Free-to-play video games
Konami games
Multiplayer and single-player video games
Video games with cross-platform play
PlayStation 4 games
PlayStation 5 games
2022
Windows games
Xbox One games
Xbox Series X and Series S games
Unreal Engine games
Android (operating system) games
IOS games
2021 video games
Video games developed in Japan